Celia Kitzinger and Sue Wilkinson are a British lesbian couple who lobbied to have their relationship recognised as a marriage in England.

Celia Kitzinger
Kitzinger is Professor of Conversation Analysis, Gender and Sexuality in the Department of Sociology at the University of York.

She has a career in academia, having published nine books and contributed over 100 articles relating to language, feminism and homosexuality. Kitzinger earned a MA degree from the University of Oxford and a PhD from the University of Reading. From 1999 to 2000 she was a visiting scholar at the University of California, Los Angeles.

Kitzinger is qualified as a chartered psychologist within the British Psychological Society (BPS), of which she was elected fellow in 1997. She is a fellow of the American Psychological Association (2000). The BPS awarded Kitzinger the 2016 Lifetime Achievement Award in recognition of her contributions to social justice and the psychology of sexualities.

Currently, Professor Kitzinger is using conversation analysis to explore the ordinary mundane reproduction of heterosexism in everyday talk-in-interaction, and aside from her work at the University of York she is also an associate editor of Feminism & Psychology.

Sue Wilkinson
Wilkinson is an emeritus professor of feminist and health studies in the Department of Social Sciences at Loughborough University in Leicestershire.

Wilkinson completed her undergraduate studies at the University of Leicester, graduating with a BSc degree in psychology. From there, she proceeded to earn a PhD specialising in gender issues, particularly regarding the role of women in psychology.

Wilkinson's first academic post was as a lecturer at the University of Liverpool; following this she took position as Head of the Psychology department at Coventry University. After Coventry, Wilkinson accepted a research post at the University of Hull, then left this post to accept a visiting professorship at the University of Waikato. After this position in 1999, Wilkinson was granted a full professorship at Loughborough, having been associated with the university since 1994. Despite this, Professor Wilkinson decided to accept a sabbatical between 2001 and 2002; she spent this year firstly working at the University of California, Santa Barbara, and then serving as a visiting scholar at the University of California, Los Angeles. The following year she took special leave to take chair as the Ruth Wynn Woodward Endowed Professor of Women's Studies at Simon Fraser University in British Columbia, Canada. It was whilst in Canada that Professor Kitzinger and Professor Wilkinson decided to marry.

Wilkinson has received great recognition as an accomplished academic, and has a strong involvement with the British Psychological Society, being instrumental in the foundation of its Psychology of Women section, for which she served as the first head, and also its Lesbian and Gay Psychology section.

Wilkinson is currently researching the expression of emotions in talk-in-interaction, as part of her role at Loughborough. Wilkinson has co-authored four books with Kitzinger, and serves as the editor of the academic journal Feminism & Psychology.

Marriage status

The couple married in Yaletown, Vancouver, in August 2003, a few weeks after same-sex marriage became legal in British Columbia, where Wilkinson had been working as a visiting professor at Simon Fraser University. On their return to the UK, the couple discovered that their relationship had no legal status at all. Two years later, with the implementation of the Civil Partnership Act, the relationship was automatically converted to a civil partnership.

The couple sued for the recognition of their marriage, the trial beginning on 5 June 2006 before Sir Mark Potter, President of the Family Division. For an overseas marriage to be recognised in the UK, it must be shown that the marriage was legal, recognised in the country in which it was executed, and that nothing in the country's law restricted freedom to marry; Kitzinger and Wilkinson argued that their marriage fulfilled these requirements even though people could not legally enter into same-sex marriages in the UK. They rejected entering a civil partnership, believing them to be both symbolically and practically a lesser substitute, and asked the court to recognise their overseas marriage in the same way that it would recognise the marriage of an opposite-sex couple. They argued that a failure to do so breached their human rights under Articles 8 (right to respect for privacy and family life), 12 (right to marry) and 14 (prohibition of discrimination), taken together with Article 8 and/or 12 of the European Convention on Human Rights, which was incorporated into domestic UK law by the Human Rights Act 1998.

In a 21 September 2005 press release issued by Liberty, the British civil rights organisation which supported their case, Kitzinger and Wilkinson said: This is fundamentally about equality. We want our marriage to be recognised as a marriage - just like any other marriage made in Canada. It is insulting and discriminatory to be offered a civil partnership instead. Civil partnerships are an important step forward for same-sex couples, but they are not enough. We want full equality in marriage.James Welch, Legal Director at Liberty, said: Our clients entered into a legal marriage in Canada. It is a matter of fairness and equality that they should be treated the same way as any other couple who marries abroad: their marriage should be recognised here. They shouldn't have to settle for the second-best option of a civil partnership.The High Court announced its judgment on 31 July 2006, finding that the marriage would continue to be recognised as a civil partnership in England and Wales, but not as a marriage. In handing down his ruling, the President of the Family Division, Sir Mark Potter, gave as his reason that "Abiding single sex relationships are in no way inferior, nor does English Law suggest that they are by according them recognition under the name of civil partnership" and that marriage was an "age-old institution" which, he suggested, was by "longstanding definition and acceptance" a relationship between a man and a woman. He described this as an "insurmountable hurdle" to the couple's case. While agreeing that they were discriminated against by the Civil Partnership Act 2004, he considered that "To the extent that by reason of that distinction it discriminates against same-sex partners, such discrimination has a legitimate aim, is reasonable and proportionate, and falls within the margin of appreciation accorded to Convention States." The Attorney General, as Second Respondent, sought £25,000 in costs.

The couple announced their intention to appeal against the decision of the High Court, but later abandoned this due to lack of funds.

On 13 March 2014, their overseas marriage was recognised by the Government as a legal marriage as the Marriage (Same Sex Couples) Act 2013 came into force.

See also
Same-sex marriage in the United Kingdom
Obergefell v. Hodges, the American court case that legalized same-sex marriage in the United States

Notes

Books
The Social Construction of Lesbianism (Sage 1987), 
Heterosexuality: A Feminism & Psychology Reader (Sage 1993),  (ed. with Sue Wilkinson)
Changing Our Minds: Lesbian Feminism and Psychology (Onlywomen Press 1993),  (with Rachel Perkins)
Women and Health: Feminist Perspectives (Taylor & Francis 1994),  (ed. with Sue Wilkinson)
Feminism and Discourse: Psychological Perspectives (Sage 1995),  (ed. with Sue Wilkinson)
Representing the Other: A Feminism & Psychology Reader (Sage 1996),  (ed. with Sue Wilkinson)
Lesbian & Gay Psychology: New Perspectives (Blackwell 2002),  (ed. with Adrian Coyle)

External links
Celia Kitzinger's web page at the University of York
Equal Marriage Rights - Celia Kitzinger & Sue Wilkinson's marriage campaign website
Full text of High Court judgement
Sue Wilkinson's web page at Loughborough University

English lesbian writers
English sociologists
Feminist studies scholars
Lesbian feminists
Married couples
Same-sex couples
Same-sex marriage in the United Kingdom